Samuel Guthrie may refer to:
Samuel Guthrie (politician) (1885–1960), British Columbia CCF MLA
Samuel Guthrie (physician) (1782–1848), U.S. physician who discovered chloroform
Samuel Zachary Guthrie, alias Cannonball, a Marvel Comics character who's a member of the New Mutants, X-Men, and Avengers